Ammotrophus platyterus is a species of sand dollar of the family Clypeasteridae. Their armour is covered with spines. It came from the genus Ammotrophus and lives in the sea. Ammotrophus platyterus was first scientifically described in 1928 by Hubert Clark.

References 

Clypeasteridae
Animals described in 1928
Taxa named by Hubert Lyman Clark